Maurice Piette (16 May 1871 – 5 July 1953) was an ex-minister of state for Monaco. He served between 1923 and 1932. He was born in 1871 and died in 1953.

References

Ministers of State of Monaco
1871 births
1953 deaths